Loon is the debut studio album by American rapper Loon. It was released on October 21, 2003 via Bad Boy Records. Production was handled by Yogi,Ryan Leslie, Younglord, 7 Aurelius, Akon, Anthony "Scoe" Walker, Bink!, Buckwild, Conrad "Rad" Dimanche, D Nat the Natural, Fredwreck, Mario Winans, P. Diddy, Shaft, Scott Storch, Trackmasters, and Loon himself. It features guest appearances from P. Diddy, Aaron Hall, Carl Thomas, Claudette Ortiz, Joe Hooker, Kelis, Mario Winans, Missy Elliott, Tammy Ruggeri, Trina and The Letter M.

The album peaked at number 6 on the Billboard 200 and number 2 on the Top R&B/Hip-Hop Albums chart. The album sold 180,000 units in its first week. "Down for Me", the single taken from the album, peaked at number 28 on the Hot R&B/Hip-Hop Singles & Tracks and number 14 on the Hot Rap Tracks.

Critical reception 

AllMusic's Jason Birchmeier found the album overlong with its romantic hip-hop tracklist but gave credit to the production for being "always fresh, lively, and above all, poppy" concluding that Loon's debut "overall should please long time Bad Boy fans and anyone who relishes the label's refined style of lovers rap". Jon Caramanica from Rolling Stone criticized Loon's delivery for lacking variations in technique and lyrical content, and said that the deviation from R&B into "moral-laden narratives ("Story" and "Don't Wanna Die")" or "joke-poking ("This Ain't Funny")" is where his seduction works the most.

Track listing

Personnel
Adapted credits from the album's booklet.
 Sean "P.Diddy" Combs: executive producer
 Harve Pierre: executive producer
 Chris Athens: mastering (Sterling Sound)
 Erik Sorensen: additional Pro Tools engineering
 Mark Pitts: associate executive producer (ByStorm Entertainment)
 Gwendolyn Niles: project manager
 Christopher Stern: creative direction

Chart positions

References

External links

2003 debut albums
Loon (rapper) albums
Bad Boy Records albums
Albums produced by Akon
Albums produced by Buckwild
Albums produced by Fredwreck
Albums produced by Sean Combs
Albums produced by Ryan Leslie
Albums produced by Scott Storch
Albums produced by Trackmasters
Albums produced by Bink (record producer)